Toby Edward Heslewood Jones  (born 7 September 1966) is an English actor. Jones is known for his extensive character actor roles on stage and screen. From 1989 to 1991 he trained at L'École Internationale de Théâtre Jacques Lecoq. He made his stage debut in 2001 in the comedy play The Play What I Wrote, which played in the West End and on Broadway, earning him a Laurence Olivier Award for Best Actor in a Supporting Role. In 2020, he was nominated for his second Olivier Award, for Best Actor for his performance in a revival of Anton Chekov's Uncle Vanya.

Jones made his film debut in Sally Potter's period drama Orlando in 1992. He appeared in minor roles in films such as Naked (1993), Les Misérables (1998), Ever After (1998), Finding Neverland (2005), and Mrs Henderson Presents (2005). He won critical acclaim for his leading role as Truman Capote in the biopic Infamous (2006). He has since acted in Amazing Grace (2006), The Painted Veil (2006), W. (2008), Frost/Nixon (2008), Tinker Tailor Soldier Spy (2011), My Week with Marilyn (2011), Berberian Sound Studio (2012), Dad's Army (2016), and Empire of Light (2022).

He is also known for his voice roles as Dobby in the Harry Potter films (2002–2011), Aristides Silk in The Adventures of Tintin (2011) and Owl in Disney's Christopher Robin (2018). He is also known for his blockbuster roles as Claudius Templesmith in The Hunger Games franchise (2012-2013), Arnim Zola in the Marvel Cinematic Universe (MCU) films Captain America: The First Avenger (2011) and Captain America: The Winter Soldier (2014), and the Disney+ television series What If...? (2021), and as Mr. Eversoll in Jurassic World: Fallen Kingdom (2018).

Jones's television credits include Doctor Who (2010), Julian Fellowes's Titanic miniseries (2012), MCU's Agent Carter (2015), and Wayward Pines (2015–2016). He was nominated for a Golden Globe Award for Best Actor – Miniseries or Television Film for his role as Alfred Hitchcock in the HBO television film The Girl (2012) and won a Best Male Comedy BAFTA for his role in Detectorists (2018). In 2017, he portrayed Culverton Smith in "The Lying Detective", an episode of the BBC crime drama Sherlock.

Early life
Jones was born in Hammersmith, London to actors Jennifer Jones (née Heslewood) and Freddie Jones. He has two brothers: Rupert, a director, and Casper, also an actor. He attended Christ Church Cathedral School and Abingdon School in Oxfordshire in the 1980s. He studied drama at the University of Manchester from 1986 to 1989, and at L'École Internationale de Théâtre Jacques Lecoq in Paris from 1989 to 1991.

Career

Film and television
Jones has appeared in more than 20 films since his first acting role in the 1992 film Orlando. He voiced Dobby in two Harry Potter films: Chamber of Secrets (2002) and The Deathly Hallows – Part 1 (2010). He played Robert Cecil, 1st Earl of Salisbury in the HBO/Channel 4 production Elizabeth I. In 2006, he portrayed Truman Capote in the biopic Infamous. He appeared in the film adaptation of Stephen King's The Mist in 2007. In 2008, he portrayed Karl Rove in Oliver Stone's W and Hollywood agent Swifty Lazar in Frost/Nixon. He appeared alongside his father in the 2004 film Ladies in Lavender.

Jones appeared in the 2010 episode "Amy's Choice", of Doctor Who, as the Dream Lord, and in the Big Finish Productions series' Dark Eyes (audio drama) as Kotris. He also played the role of Samuel Ratchett in Agatha Christie's Poirot TV Series 12 episode "Murder on the Orient Express". In 2011, he played the role of the British spy master Percy Alleline in the adaptation of John Le Carré's Tinker Tailor Soldier Spy and Arnim Zola in Captain America: The First Avenger, a role which he reprised in the sequel Captain America: The Winter Soldier three years later as well as in a cameo in the TV series Agent Carter the following year. In 2012, he had a leading role in the ITV mini-series Titanic, starred as one of the seven dwarves in Snow White and the Huntsman, played Dr. Paul Shackleton in Red Lights, and Max in Virginia. He also portrayed film director Alfred Hitchcock in the HBO television film The Girl, a role that earned him his first Golden Globe Award nomination, as well as his first Primetime Emmy Award nomination.

In 1998, he appeared as a City businessman in the music video for Gomez's song "Whippin' Piccadilly", from their album Bring It On.

He played Neil Baldwin in the BBC drama Marvellous in 2014. Sam Wollaston, in The Guardian, praised Jones's "lovely, very human, performance", one that earned him his second British Academy Television Award nomination. From 2014, he appeared in the BBC Four television series Detectorists, for which he received a nomination for the British Academy Television Award for Best Male Comedy Performance in 2016 before winning the award in 2018.

In 2015, Jones played the part of Roger Yount, a banker, in the three-part BBC series Capital based on John Lanchester's novel of the same name. Discussing working with Jones on Capital, writer Peter Bowker said, "I think Toby is a genius and thought that long before I worked with him. He always wants to know a character's needs, and what's beneath those needs. Then he takes all that material and somehow embeds it into the character and physically inhabits the character, so that you never think he's playing the character. It's fascinating to watch him close up. He carries the emotional complexities in every tiny gesture that his character makes so that you immediately can see what his character is like. A character like Roger is full of contradictions, a city banker with an air of entitlement but also a little insecurity picking away at him. Toby can portray that in his walk alone. That's what's great about him, he can portray cold he can portray warm and he can portray both of those things at once."

He plays Captain Mainwaring in the film Dad's Army, released in February 2016. In July, of the same year he starred as the eponymous agent Verloc in the BBC's The Secret Agent, a 3-part television adaptation of Joseph Conrad's 1907 novel.

In 2017, he portrayed Culverton Smith in "The Lying Detective", an episode of the BBC crime drama Sherlock. In 2018, he played the dinosaur auctioneer Mr. Eversoll in Jurassic World: Fallen Kingdom, the fifth installment of the Jurassic Park series. In the same year, Jones voiced Owl in Disney's live-action Christopher Robin.

In 2018, he was awarded an honorary doctorate by Oxford Brookes University.

Radio and audiobooks
In 2003 Jones played the part of Lord Brideshead in a BBC Radio adaptation of Brideshead Revisited. Jones voiced the title character in the 2005 BBC Radio 4 adaptation of Oblomov. He also read the 2009 Radio 4 adaptation of John Irving's A Prayer for Owen Meany. He played Inspector Goole in the 2010 BBC Radio adaptation of An Inspector Calls. Since 2013 Jones has been the voice of the lead character, Joey Oldman in the BBC Radio 4 series The Corrupted, an adaptation of the G. F. Newman novel Crime and Punishment. On 2 December 2012 he played Napoleon Bonaparte in Anthony Burgess's Napoleon Rising on Radio 3. In 2013 he played Kotris in the award-winning Doctor Who audio play, Dark Eyes, and read an abridged version of "The Manual of Detection" by Jedediah Berry for the BBC. In 2020 he portrayed Falstaff in BBC Radio 3's Henry IV, Part 1.

In 2021, Jones recorded the audiobook version of John Le Carre's final novel Silverview for Penguin Audio.

Stage
In 2001, he starred in the London West End comedy The Play What I Wrote, directed by Kenneth Branagh. His comic turn as Arthur earned him the Olivier Award for Best Actor in a Supporting Role, and the play moved to Broadway in 2003.

In 2009, he returned to the stage in Every Good Boy Deserves Favour at the National Theatre, Parlour Song at the Almeida Theatre, and The First Domino at Brighton Festival Fringe. In 2011, he played J. M. W. Turner in The Painter at the Arcola Theatre. Jones starred as Stanley in the 2018 revival of The Birthday Party at The Harold Pinter Theatre.
In 2020, he starred in the title role in the Conor McPherson adaptation of Uncle Vanya by Anton Chekhov, at the Harold Pinter Theatre.

Personal life 
On The Graham Norton Show, Jones said that he and his wife Karen were together for 25 years before they married in 2015. They have two daughters.

Jones was appointed Officer of the Order of the British Empire (OBE) in the 2021 New Year Honours for services to drama.

Filmography

Film

Television

Theatre

Theme park attractions

Awards and nominations

Film

Television

Theatre

See also
 List of Old Abingdonians

References

External links

 

1966 births
Living people
20th-century English male actors
21st-century English male actors
Alumni of the Victoria University of Manchester
Audiobook narrators
Best Male Comedy Performance BAFTA Award (television) winners
English male film actors
English male radio actors
English male stage actors
English male television actors
English male voice actors
Laurence Olivier Award winners
L'École Internationale de Théâtre Jacques Lecoq alumni
Male actors from London
Officers of the Order of the British Empire
People educated at Abingdon School
People educated at Christ Church Cathedral School
People from Hammersmith
People associated with Oxford Brookes University